Agapanthoideae is a monotypic subfamily of monocot flowering plants in the family Amaryllidaceae, order Asparagales. It is one of three subfamilies of Amaryllidaceae. It was formerly treated as a separate family, Agapanthaceae.  The subfamily name is derived from the generic name of the type genus, Agapanthus.

Its sole genus, Agapanthus, is endemic to South Africa.

References

External links

Asparagales subfamilies
Monotypic plant taxa
Amaryllidoideae